Ciocîlteni is a commune in Orhei District, Moldova. It is composed of three villages: Ciocîlteni, Clișova Nouă and Fedoreuca.

References

Communes of Orhei District
Orgeyevsky Uyezd